Wagoner, Waggoner and Waggonner are surnames. Notable people with one of these surnames include:

 Betty Wagoner (1930–2006), All-American Girls Professional Baseball League pitcher
 Daniel Waggoner (1828–1902), early American settler and rancher
 David Wagoner (born 1926), American poet
 E. Paul Waggoner (1889–1967), American rancher and horsebreeder
 Electra Waggoner (1882–1925), American rancher and socialite
 Electra Waggoner Biggs (1912–2001), American sculptor, daughter of E. Paul and Electra Waggoner
 Ellet J. Waggoner (1855–1916), American Seventh-day Adventist theologian
 George Chester Robinson Wagoner (1863–1946), American politician, U.S. Representative from Missouri
 Guy Waggoner (1883–1950), American rancher and business executive
 Harold E. Wagoner (1905–1986), American ecclesiastical architect
 J. T. Waggoner (born 1937), American politician
 Jarom Wagoner, American city planner and politician
 Jeff Waggoner, American college baseball coach
 Joe Waggonner (1918–2007), American politician
 Kenneth S. Wagoner (1911–2000), American professor and physiological skin scientist
 Kirk Wagoner, American politician
 Kristen Waggoner, American attorney
 Lyle Waggoner (1935–2020), American actor
 Mark Wagoner (born 1971), American politician
 Marsha Waggoner (born 1940), American professional poker player
 Murray Van Wagoner (1898–1986), American politician, Governor of Michigan
 Paul Waggoner (born 1979), American musician
 Philip Dakin Wagoner (1876–1962), American businessman, chairman of the Underwood Typewriter Company 
 Porter Wagoner (1927–2007), American country music singer
 Rick Wagoner (born 1953), American businessman, former Chairman and CEO of General Motors
 Sophronia Wilson Wagoner (1834 - 1929), pioneer missionary
 Tim Waggoner (born 1964), American author
 William Thomas Waggoner (1852–1934),  American rancher, oilman, banker, horse breeder and philanthropist
 William Van Wagoner (1870–after 1920), American bicycle racer, designer of the Van Wagoner
 Willie Waggonner (1905–1976), Louisiana sheriff
 Winfred E. Wagoner (1888–1948), American educator

Occupational surnames